Vouvatusjärvi is a lake on the border between Norway and Russia. The Norwegian part lies in Sør-Varanger municipality, Finnmark county, while the Russian part lies in Murmansk Oblast.

Lakes of Murmansk Oblast
Norway–Russia border